The 1954 Tennessee A&I Tigers football team represented Tennessee Agricultural & Industrial State College as a member of the Midwest Athletic Association (MAA) during the 1954 college football season.

The team was selected by the "Pigskin Huddle" as the 1954 black college national champion.  The Pittsburgh Courier selected the Tigers as black college national co-champion in a five-way tie with four other teams.

Coach Kean suffered a double heart attack following the team's December 4 game with North Carolina Central. He did not return as the team's coach and died one year later in December 1955.

Schedule

References

Tennessee A&I
Tennessee State Tigers football seasons
Black college football national champions
Tennessee A&I Tigers